is a passenger railway station in the city of Inzai, Chiba Prefecture, Japan, operated by the third-sector railway operator Hokusō Railway.

Lines

Station layout
This station consists of two ground-level island platforms serving four tracks, with an elevated station building located above to one side.

Platforms

Adjacent stations

History
Inzai-Makinohara Station was opened on 1 April 1995. On 17 July 2010 a station numbering system was introduced to the Hokusō Line, with the station designated HS13.

Passenger statistics
In fiscal 2018, the station was used by an average of 14,410 passengers daily.

Surrounding area
Chiba New Town

See also
 List of railway stations in Japan

References

External links

  Hokusō Line station information 

Railway stations in Japan opened in 1995
Railway stations in Chiba Prefecture
Hokusō Line
Railway stations in highway medians
Inzai